Boxing at the 2005 Southeast Asian Games took place in the University of St. La Salle Coliseum in Bacolod, Negros Occidental, Philippines.

The event traditionally was only open to males in the Olympic Games. In the 2005 edition of the games women compete in some selected events. Bouts were contested over four rounds of two minutes each. Five judges score the fighters and the boxer with the most points at the end was the winner.

Medal table

Medalists

Men

Women

References
Southeast Asian Games Official Results

2005 Southeast Asian Games events
Boxing at the Southeast Asian Games
2005 in boxing
Boxing competitions in the Philippines